Japan competed as the host nation of the 2020 Summer Paralympics in their capital Tokyo from 24 August to 5 September 2021.

Medalists

Competitors
The following is the list of number of competitors participating in the Games:

Archery

Japan fielded nine archers (four men and five women) at the Games, as the host nation is automatically entitled to use the individual quota places.

Men's individual

Women's individual

Mixed team

Athletics

Japan have secured three quotas in athletics after being in the top four of the 2019 World Para Athletics Marathon Championships and twelve more automatic qualification slots at the 2019 World Para Athletics Championships.

Men's road & track

Men's field

Women's road & track

Women's field

Badminton 

Men

Women

* Nipada Saensupa from Thailand retired during the match between Ma Huihui from China, though the result doesn't count.

Mixed

Boccia

Cycling

Road
Men

Women

Track 
Men

Women

Equestrian

Football 5-a-side

Roster

Group stage

Fifth place match

Goalball

Under goalball rules, as the host nation, Japan gets one of the ten slots for the men's, and women's, competitions.  There are up to six athletes on the court at a time; three athletes per team are allowed on the court at one time.

Men

Group stage

Quarter-final

Women

Group stage

Quarterfinal

Semi-final

Bronze medal match

Judo

Men

Women

Paracanoeing

Men

Women

Paratriathlon

Powerlifting

Rowing

Japan qualified two boats in the women's single sculls and mixed coxed four events for the games. Women's single sculls crews qualified by winning the gold medal at the 2021 FISA Asian & Oceanian Qualification Regatta in Tokyo, while mixed coxed four received the bipartite commission invitation allocation quotas.

Qualification Legend: FA=Final A (medal); FB=Final B (non-medal); R=Repechage

Shooting

Mixed

Swimming 

Five Japanese swimmers have qualified to compete in swimming at the 2020 Summer Paralympics via the 2019 World Para Swimming Championships slot allocation method.
Men

Women

Table tennis

Japan as host nation, entered five athletes into the table tennis competition at the games. Takashi Asano qualified from 2019 ITTF Asian Para Championships which was held in Taichung, Taiwan and four others via World Ranking allocation.

Men

Women

Taekwondo

Japan as the host nation qualified three athletes to compete in three events at the Paralympics competition.

Sitting Volleyball

The women's sitting volleyball team finished in 10th place at the 2018 World ParaVolley Championships in the Netherlands but they hope to improve their volleyball skills before the home games.

Summary

Men's tournament 

Group play

Seventh place match

Women's tournament 

Group play

Seventh place match

Wheelchair basketball

Men's tournament

Roster

Groupstage

Quarter-final

Semi-final

Gold medal match

Women's tournament

Roster

Groupstage

Quarter-final

5th–6th classification playoff

Wheelchair fencing

Wheelchair rugby

Japan national wheelchair rugby team qualified for the Games automatically as the host nation quotas.

Team roster
 Team event – 1 team of 12 player

Group stage

Semi final

Bronze medal match

Wheelchair tennis

Japan qualified twelve players entries for wheelchair tennis. Shingo Kunieda and Yui Kamiji qualified by winning the gold medal at the 2018 Asian Para Games in Jakarta. Meanwhile ten other athletes qualified by world rankings.

See also
Japan at the Paralympics
Japan at the 2020 Summer Olympics

References

Nations at the 2020 Summer Paralympics
2020
2021 in Japanese sport